Rib Mountain State Park is a  Wisconsin state park near the city of Wausau. The park includes a ski resort, Granite Peak Ski Area, concession stand, picnic areas, a reservable amphitheater, a former quarry, observation tower, and 15.1 miles of trails. The park is ten miles (16 km) north-northwest of Central Wisconsin Airport.

History

Geologic 
The park sits along top a long tall and narrow ridge of quartzite that rises from the relatively flat central Wisconsin plain. The quartzite ridge dates back to the Penokean orogeny ~1.8 billion years ago, before this the quartzite was a large sandstone deposit on the edge of a shallow sea. The volcanic activity that resulted from the orogeny metamorphosed the sandstone into the present day quartzite. The resulting quartzite is hard and much more resistant to erosion than the surrounding rock and over the following millennia the softer surrounding rock eroded away revealing the present day ridge.

Pre Colonial 
Central Wisconsin, where the park is located was once populated by the Chippewa, they referred to the ridge as O-pic-wun-a-se-be, sometimes given as "Opigigan" or "Opigeganama." The first part of the word meaning rib. It was used as a lookout point and navigational landmark by both the Chippewa and early white explorers.

1800s 
Early settlers sought to make use of the mountains mineral resources, many prospected for gold, but were unsuccessful. In 1893 Jacob Kolter began quarrying the quartzite on the west side of the mountain for use in the manufacture of sandpaper.

1900s 
The quarry proved to be commercially successful and in 1900 the Wausau Sandpaper Company was incorporated to use the quartzite from the quarry for the manufacture of sandpaper. Two years later, in 1902, the Wausau Quartz Company was founded to crush the quartzite from the quarry for grinding and polishing purposes. The two companies merged in 1905 to form Wausau Abrasives, which was purchased by Minnesota Mining and Manufacturing in 1929.

The Wausau Kiwanis Club recognized the mountain's recreational potential. The club bought 120 acres of land at the top in 1922 and 40 more acres years later. The club asked the Wisconsin Conservation Department (predecessor of the DNR) if Rib Mountain could become a state park and the department accepted a gift of 40 acres in 1923 with official park designation occurring in 1927.

Many men in the community made it a point to climb to the top of the mountain at least once a year, probably just to prove that they could do it, according to a 1926 article in the Wausau Daily Record Herald. It was not an easy climb because of the dense forest and lack of paths.

The mountain remained undeveloped until 1929 when a special committee of the local Chamber of Commerce spearheaded a drive to have a road built to the summit. The road was completed in 1931 and the Kiwanis Club funded a 200-foot entrance right-of-way.

In July 1935, a Civilian Conservation Corps (CCC) camp was set up on the west bank of the Wisconsin River in the town of Rib Mountain. The CCC created walking paths, widened the road, developed a campground and built a picnic area gazebo in the park. Around the same time Chamber of Commerce leader, Walter Roehl, had convinced the Conservation Department that Rib Mountain would make a fine winter ski area and the CCC began work on clearing the slopes and installing a T-bar lift.

The first ski event was the Central Ski Association Championship February 24-25, 1938. The slalom, downhill, cross-country and jumping events attracted more than 465 participants and 3,000 spectators.

The CCC built a shelter house, which was opened in December 1939. The shelter is still in use today by Granite Peak Ski Area. Land gifts expanded the park to 606 acres in 1970 and nearly 860 acres by 1982. In the early 1980s 3M closed the quarry and gifted it to the DNR for inclusion in the park. It is accessible via the parks trails, and can be used for bouldering, although no serious rock climbing is allowed due to the fractured rock. Remnants of the quarrying operation, including a dynamite shed can be found in the park.

2000s 
In 2006, the upper level of the shelter/chalet was dedicated in honor of the 10th Mountain Alpine Division. The 10th Mountain Alpine Division served in the Italian Alps during WWII. Many of the original members of the Division are from the Wausau area and learned to ski at Rib Mountain.

See also
Rib Mountain

External links
Rib Mountain State Park official website
The Friends of Rib Mountain State Park

Protected areas of Marathon County, Wisconsin
State parks of Wisconsin
Protected areas established in 1927
1927 establishments in Wisconsin

Quarries
Quarries in the United States
Quarries in Wisconsin
Civilian Conservation Corps in Wisconsin

Tourist attractions in Marathon County, Wisconsin
Tourist attractions in Wisconsin